Caine is a river located in the eastern cordilleras of the Bolivian Andes in South America. It flows through the Cochabamba Department and the Potosí Department.
{ "type": "ExternalData", "service": "geoline", "ids": "Q2179099", "properties": { "stroke": "#3b78cb", "stroke-width": 4 } }

See also 
 Jaya Mayu
 Puka Mayu

Caine
Rivers of Cochabamba Department